This is a list of locations in Jerusalem sometimes described by the term East Jerusalem:

Locations in Jordanian municipality (1949–1967)

The following locations were included within the borders of the Jordanian municipality in the eastern part of the city between 1949 and 1967:

American Colony
The Garden Tomb
Bab a-Zahara
Old City of Jerusalem
Armenian Quarter
Christian Quarter
Jewish Quarter
Muslim Quarter
Sheikh Jarrah
Silwan (added in Jordan's 1961 municipal expansion)
Wadi al-Joz

Locations in expanded Jerusalem municipality (1967–present)

The following locations were included within the borders of the Israeli municipality after its expansion following the 1967 Six-Day War, formalised in the 1980 Israeli Jerusalem Law:

At-Tur
Beit Hanina
Beit Safafa
Jabel Mukaber
Jebel Batan al-Hawa
Kafr 'Aqab
Ras al-Amud
Sawahra al-Arbiya
Sharafat
Shuafat
Sur Baher
Umm Tuba

External links 

 B'Tselem – The Separation Barrier
 Large PDF map of the West Bank that shows details of Jerusalem and surroundings

Neighbourhoods of Jerusalem
Geography of Palestine (region)
East J
East J
20th century in Jerusalem